Portage Lake is a lake in Aitkin County, Minnesota, in the United States.

Portage Lake was so named from the fact that at the lake it was no longer necessary to portage the canoe.

See also
List of lakes in Minnesota

References

Lakes of Minnesota
Lakes of Aitkin County, Minnesota